This is a list of rivers in County Mayo, Ireland.

 Aille River
 Altaconey River
 Altderg River
 Ballinglen River
 Ballyteige River
 Belderg River
 Belfarsad River
 Belladooan River
 Bellakip River
 Bellananaminnan River
 Black River
 Boghadoon River
 Buleenshough River
 Bulken River
 Bunanakee River
 Bunanioo River
 Bundonagh River
 Bunnadober River
 Bunnaho River
 Bunnahowna River
 Bunnowen River
 Caheer River
 Camage River
 Carra River
 Carrowbeg River
 Carrowsallagh River
 Cartron River
 Castlebar River
 Castlehill River
 River Clare
 Claureen River
 Cloon River
 Cloonaghmore River
 Cloonlaghan River
 Cloonlee River
 Clydah River
 River Cong
 Cullentragh River
 Derrimurchers River
 Duvowen River
 River Erriff
 Gallaghers River
 Glasheens River
 Glenamoy River
 Glencullin River
 Glendanurk River
 Glendaruck River
 Glenedagh River
 Gleninaigh River
 Glenlaur River
 Glennamong River
 Glenthomas River
 Glenulra River
 Glenummern River
 Glore River
 Goulaun River
 Gweedeney River
 Gweestion River
 Heathfield River
 Keel River
 Keerglen River
 Little River
 Lugatoran River
 Lugayeran River
 Mannin River
 Manulla River
 Meander River
 Meenbog River
 River Moy
 Moyour River
 Muingnabo River
 Muingnakinkee River
 Mumkin River
 Murrevagh River
 Newport River
 Owenaglogh River
 Owenduff River
 Owengarr River
 Oweninny River
 Owenmore River
 Owennabruckagh River
 Owennadornaun River
 Owenoniny River
 Owenpollaphuca River
 Owenwee River
 Pollagh River
 Rathroe River
 River Robe
 Rossow River
 Shanvolahan River
 Skerdagh River
 Sraheens River
 Srahmeen River
 Srahmore River
 Srahrevagh River
 Sralagagh River
 Strade River
 Tarraghaghmore River
 Tobergal River
 Toormore River
 Trimoge River
 Yellow River

See also
 List of rivers in Ireland
 Rivers of Ireland

References

 
Rivers, Mayo
Rivers